Frank Osler (10 February 1888 – 17 January 1935) was a Scotland international rugby union player. He played at the Scrum-half position.

Rugby Union career

Amateur career

Osler played rugby union for Edinburgh University.

At the end of the 1912-13 The Scottish Referee remarked on the Edinburgh University side's season:
Edinburgh University had quite a good season, but it ought to have been much better, and there is a general feeling that F. Osler should never have been dropped from the side, while the centre three-quarters were chopped and changed too frequently. The finish was disappointing, a share of the championship being let slip by successive defeats, when weakly represented, from Edinburgh Academicals and Hawick.

Provincial career

Osler played in the Inter-City match on 3 December 1910 for Edinburgh District against Glasgow District.

He played for the Whites Trial side against the Blues Trial side on 21 January 1911 while still with Edinburgh University.

He injured his ribs playing in the trial match, but there was no fracture and he was expected to then play for Scotland against Wales in the upcoming international match.

International career

Osler was capped by Scotland for 2 matches in 1911.

References

1888 births
1935 deaths
Scottish rugby union players
Edinburgh University RFC players
Scotland international rugby union players
Edinburgh District (rugby union) players
Whites Trial players
Rugby union players from the Western Cape
Rugby union scrum-halves